East River Township is a township in Page County, Iowa, USA.

History
East River Township is named from the East Nodaway River.

References

Townships in Page County, Iowa
Townships in Iowa